The Sahel Train is an electrified, metre gauge railway and suburban rail line with trains serving Sousse and Mahdia, with a spur to Monastir, in Tunisia. The  line has overhead electrification at 25 kV, 50 Hz.

Stations 
The line's stations are, working southwards:
 Sousse - Bab Jadid
 Sousse - Mohamed V
 Sousse South
 Sousse Industrial Zone
 Sahline
 Sahline Sebkha
 Hotels Monastir
 Skanes-Monastir airport station
 La Faculté
 Gare Habib Bourguiba Monastir
 Monastir Industrial Zone
 Khniss - Bembla
 Ksiba Bennane
 Bouhjar
 Lamta
 Sayada
 Ksar Hellal Industrial Zone
 Ksar Hellal
 Moknine Gribaa
 Moknine
 Téboulba Industrial Zone
 Téboulba
 Bekalta
 Baghdadi
 Mahdia tourist-Zone
 Sidi Messaoud Simes
 Borj Arif
 Mahdia Ezzahra
Gare Mahdia

Gallery

References 

 Timetables

External links 

 

Railway lines in Tunisia
Metre gauge railways in Tunisia